"Ma'oz Tzur" is a Jewish liturgical poem or piyyut. It is written in Hebrew, and is sung on the holiday of Hanukkah, after lighting the festival lights. The hymn is named for its Hebrew incipit, which means "Strong Rock (of my Salvation)" and is a name or epithet for God in Judaism. It is thought to have been written sometime in the 13th century, although recent research suggests the 12th century. It was originally sung only at home, but has been used in the synagogue since the 19th century or earlier. In more recent years, of its six stanzas sometimes only the first stanza is sung (or the first and fifth).

Time and author 

"Ma'oz Tzur Yeshuati" is commonly thought to have been written in the 13th century, during the Crusades. The first letters of the first five stanzas form an acrostic of the composer's name, Mordechai (the five Hebrew letters מרדכי). There are several hypotheses regarding his identity. He may have been the Mordecai ben Isaac ha-Levi who wrote the Sabbath table-hymn "Mah Yafit". Judging from the appeal in the closing verse, he may have been the Mordecai whose father-in-law was martyred at Mayence (now Mainz, Germany) in 1096 as part of the First Crusade.

Avraham Fränkel (2014) suggests it was composed in Germany between 1160 and 1190.

Some argue that the sixth stanza is an original part of the poem and was removed due to concerns of creating conflict with non-Jews, while others argue that it is a late addition.

Content
The hymn retells Jewish history in poetic form and celebrates deliverance from four ancient enemies, Pharaoh, Nebuchadnezzar, Haman and Antiochus. Like much medieval Jewish liturgical poetry, it is full of allusions to Biblical literature and rabbinic interpretation. Thus, malchut eglah denotes Egypt (Jeremiah 46:20);  is Nebuchadnezzar; y’mini is Mordechai (Esther 2:5); y’vanim is Antiochus; shoshanim is the Jewish people (Shir HaShirim 2:2); b’nei vinah are the rabbinic sages; and shir refers to the Hallel psalms.

A second acrostic is found in the first letters of the opening words of the final stanza, the acrostic contains the word hazak (meaning "be strong").

The four middle stanzas refer to the salvations from the four persecutions of the Jewish people: The Exodus from Egypt,  the end of the Babylonian captivity, escaping the persecution in Persia by Haman (the miracle of Purim according to the Book of Esther) and the successful revolt against the Greek rule in Syria during the Hasmonean period, as commemorated by Hanukkah.

The first and last stanzas are written in the present tense. The first expresses hope for the rebuilding of the Temple and for the defeat of enemies, who are metaphorically referred to as barking (menabe'ah). 

The final stanza once again calls for divine retribution against the enemies of the Jewish people. The term Admon, meaning "the red one", was understood by some to refer to the emperor, Friedrich Barbarossa, whose name means Frederick "Redbeard". It was speculated that it was a later addition; at least it was not found in print up to the 18th century, however recently a siddur of Rabbi Eliezer ben Nathan (1090-1170) was found, which included the sixth stanza. It is suggested that the stanza was passed only in oral tradition as self-censorship due to its strong anti-Christian hints.

Tune 

The bright and stirring tune now so generally associated with "Ma'oz tzur" serves as the "representative theme" in musical references to the feast (compare Addir Hu, Aḳdamut, Hallel). It is sung almost universally by Jews on this festival (although there are many other traditional melodies ). It has come to be regarded as the only Hanukkah melody, four other Hebrew hymns for the occasion being also sung to it ). It was originally sung for "" (שני זיתים or שני זתים, "Two Olives" (the ones that supply oil to the Menorah from Zechariah's vision, Zech. 4)), a piyyut, preceding the Shema of shaharith of the (first) Shabat of Hanukah. Curiously enough, "Shene Zetim" alone is now sometimes sung to a melody which two centuries ago was associated with "Ma'oz tzur". The latter is a Jewish-sounding air in the minor mode, and is found in Benedetto Marcello's "Estro Poetico Armonico," or "Parafrasi Sopra li Salmi" (Venice, 1724), quoted as a melody of the German Jews, and utilized by Marcello as the theme for his "Psalm XV." This air has been transcribed by Cantor Birnbaum of Königsberg in the "Israelitische Wochenschrift" (1878, No. 51)

This most popular melody for the Hanukkah hymn has been identified by Birnbaum as an adaptation from the old German folk-song "So weiss ich eins, dass mich erfreut, das pluemlein auff preiter heyde," given in Böhme's "Altdeutsches Liederbuch" (No. 635); it was widely spread among German Jews as early as 1450. By an interesting coincidence, this folk-melody was also the first utilized by Luther for his German chorales. He set it to his "Nun freut euch, lieben Christen g'mein". It is the tune for a translation by F. E. Cox of the hymn "Sei Lob und Ehr dem höchsten Gut," by J. J. Schütz (1640–1730). As such it is called "Erk" (after the German hymnologist), and, with harmonies by Bach (BWV 388), appears as No. 283 of "Hymns, Ancient and Modern" (London, 1875). The earliest transcription of the Jewish form of the tune is by Isaac Nathan, who set it to the poem "On Jordan's Banks" in Byron's "Hebrew Melodies" (London, 1815). Later transcriptions have been numerous, and the air finds a place in every collection of Jewish melodies. It was modified to the form now favoured by British Jews by Julius Mombach, to whom is due the modulation to the dominant in the repetition of the first strain. In Mombach's version the closing phrase of each verse is not repeated.

Text

English version 
A popular non-literal translation, called "Rock of Ages", is based on the German version by Leopold Stein (1810–1882), and was written by Talmudic linguist Marcus Jastrow and Gustav Gottheil.

These are the original English lyrics, which are sometimes changed into gender neutral language.

In popular culture 

In this song Shemer drew a connection between the Jewish hymn and the military positions that were attacked in the War of Attrition of the time.

References

External links

 Irwin Oppenheim, "Chanukah Songs" at Chazzanut Online. Web page includes MIDI audio of the German and Italian tunes for Maoz Tzur and of the Dutch tune for Shene Zetim.
 Sephardic Pizmonim Project: Contains the song and can be heard according to Sephardic tradition.

Hanukkah traditions
Jewish prayer and ritual texts
Hebrew-language songs
Hanukkah music
Hebrew words and phrases in Jewish prayers and blessings
Jewish poetry